Stereotypes of Arabs and Muslims in the United States have been presented in various forms by the mass media in the American culture. Stereotypical representations of Arabs are often manifested in a society's media, literature, theater and other creative expressions. These representations, which have been historically and predominantly negative, have adverse repercussions for Arab Americans and Muslims in daily interactions and in current events. In American textbooks, which theoretically should be less-creative expressions, similar negative and inaccurate stereotypes are also found for Arabs and Muslims.

“Billionaires, bombers, and belly dancers”
A report titled "100 Years of Anti-Arab and Anti-Muslim stereotyping" by Mazin B. Qumsiyeh, director of media relations for the American Arab Anti-Discrimination Committee, specifies what some in the Arab American community call "the three B syndrome": "Arabs in TV and movies are portrayed as either bombers, belly dancers, or billionaires" in reference to Arab men being portrayed either as terrorists or as wealthy oilmen, and Arab women being portrayed as sex objects. Also the report mentioned that even cartoons have been insulting to Arab and Muslims and how the people who live in the US and interact with its community are the most affected by these stereotypes because they will be treated differently at many points. The report also explains that these stereotypes don't only cause psychological harm (culture, insult) but also helps feed into actions that are physically harmful by dehumanizing a group first before attacking it. According to Mazin B. Qumsiyeh:Thomas Edison made a short film in 1897 for his patented Kinetoscope in which "Arab" women with enticing clothes dance to seduce a male audience. The short clip was called Fatima Dances (Belly dancer stereotype). The trend has shifted over the years and was dominated by the "billionaires" for a short while especially during the oil crises in the seventies. However, in the last 30 years, the predominant stereotype by far has been the "Arab bombers."In a piece in the Los Angeles Times published July 28, 1997, Laila Lalami offers a 12-step guide to making a successful Arab-bashing movie, including such items as "the villains must all have beards", "they must all wear keffiehs", "they must all have names like Ali, Abdul or Mustapha" and "have them threaten to blow something up."

After the September 11th terrorist attacks, Arab-American actors have found themselves even more likely to be type-cast as a terrorist.

Jack Shaheen, Professor Emeritus of Mass Communications at Southern Illinois University, documented these trends in his book The TV Arab, which identifies more than 21 major movies released over ten years which show the U.S. military killing Arabs with Arabs depicted as being terrorists or enemies of the United States. These include:
Iron Eagle (1986)
Navy SEALs (1990)
Patriot Games (1992)
Executive Decision (1996)

In Reel Bad Arabs, Shaheen writes that "television's image of the Arab is omnipresent [and] is becoming a part of American folklore." He also writes that Arabs have "consistently appeared in American popular culture as billionaires, bombers, and belly dancers."

Arab Muslims are fanatics who believe in a different god, who don't value human life as much as we do, they are intent on destroying us (the west) with their oil or with their terrorism; the men seek to abduct and brutally seduce our women; they are without family and reside in a primitive place (the desert) and behave like primitive beings. The women are subservient — resembling black crows — or we see them portrayed as mute, somewhat exotic harem maidens.

The movies which Shaheen identifies as the five worst in terms of negative portrayal of Arabs in modern films are:
Rules of Engagement (2000); "a film which "justifies" US Marines killing Arab women and children."
The Delta Force (1986)
Death Before Dishonor (1987)
True Lies (1994); "Arnold S. INC." shoots dead Palestinians like clay pigeons. "
Wanted: Dead or Alive (1987); "Arab thugs... plan to ignite Los Angeles... killing millions."

The problem of these stereotypes is the main focus of the semi-autobiographical film Driving to Zigzigland, where the actor/taxi driver Bashar Daas finds himself being invariably typecast as an Arab Muslim extremist in US film auditions.

Another stereotypical character is Achmed The Dead Terrorist by Jeff Dunham which has been named mockingly on the prophet of Islam's second name Ahmad. However there has been no action or reaction from the American public and human rights or any religious group against this and other stereotypical characters in this show till date.

Airport racial profiling after 9/11

In the aftermath of the September 11 attacks in which 15 of the 19 hijackers were of Saudi Arabian origin and all were of Muslim faith, Arabs and Muslims complained of increased scrutiny and racial profiling at airports. In a poll conducted by the Boston Globe, 71 percent of Blacks and 57 percent of Whites believed that "Arabs and Arab-Americans should undergo special, more intensive security checks before boarding airplanes." Some Muslims and Arabs have complained of being held without explanation and subjected to hours of questioning and arrest without cause. Such cases have led to lawsuits being filed by the American Civil Liberties Union. Fox News radio host Mike Gallagher suggested that airports have a "Muslims Only" line in the wake of the 9/11 attacks stating "It's time to have a Muslims check-point line in America's airports and have Muslims be scrutinized. You better believe it, it's time." In Queens, New York, Muslims and Arabs have complained that the NYPD is unfairly targeting Muslim communities in raids tied to the alleged Zazi terror plot.

See also
Anti-Arabism 
Reel Bad Arabs
Ethnic stereotype
Flying while Muslim
Islamophobia in the United States
Orientalism
Orientalism, a 1978 book by Edward Said
Racial profiling
Stereotype threat
Stereotypes of groups within the United States

References

Further reading

Presumed Guilty: American Muslim and Arabs Presumed Guilty: American Muslims and Arabs on Making Contact

External links
Arabs in Film and Television: A Bibliography via UC Berkeley library
Images of Arabs and the Middle East videography of films on video and DVD in the UC Berkeley Media Resources Center

Anti-Arabism in North America
Ethnic and racial stereotypes in the United States
Islamophobia in the United States
Islam-related controversies
Stereotypes of Arab people